Angela Jane Burns  is a British businesswoman and politician who was elected as Conservative AM for Carmarthen West and South Pembrokeshire from 2007 to 2021.

Background
Burns was from an English family and brought up in several foreign countries. She went into business after leaving school, working for companies such as Waitrose, Thorn EMI and Asda. She later moved to Pembrokeshire with her husband and became active in politics.

In recent times she has become involved with local issues in south Pembrokeshire, particularly the proposed downgrading of the two District Hospitals of Glangwili and Withybush. No such downgrading has occurred.

Political career
She defeated the sitting Labour Party member Christine Gwyther by only 98 votes, and Plaid Cymru's John Dixon by 250 votes, in a very close three-way contest in the 2007 Senedd election. She was the Shadow Minister for Finance and Public Sector Delivery from 11 July 2007 to 16 June 2008, and became the Shadow Minister for Transport and Regeneration on 22 October 2008, followed by a period as shadow education Minister and since 2016 has been the Shadow Cabinet Secretary for Health and Well-Being.

Burns was appointed Member of the Order of the British Empire (MBE) in the 2022 Birthday Honours for political and public service.

References

External links
 
 Member Profile at the National Assembly for Wales
 Personal website

Offices held

Year of birth missing (living people)
Living people
Wales AMs 2007–2011
Wales AMs 2011–2016
Wales MSs 2016–2021
Conservative Party members of the Senedd
Female members of the Senedd
People from Pembrokeshire
Members of the Order of the British Empire